Nina Louise Herbert (born 1966), is a female former swimmer who competed for England.

Swimming career
Herbert became National champion in 1984 when she won the 1984 ASA National Championship title in the 200 metres breaststroke.

She represented England in the 200 metres breaststroke event, at the 1986 Commonwealth Games in Edinburgh, Scotland.

References

1966 births
English female swimmers
Swimmers at the 1986 Commonwealth Games
Living people
Commonwealth Games competitors for England
20th-century English women